Ephemeroidea is a superfamily of mayflies. Members of this superfamily are found in most parts of the world with the exception of the Arctic, the Antarctic and Australia.

The following families are recognised:

Behningiidae
Ephemeridae
Euthyplociidae
Palingeniidae
Polymitarcyidae
Potamanthidae

References

Mayflies